Alchemy Vol.1 is the first international compilation album by the Finnish rock band Poets of the Fall. It was released in Finland as well as on iTunes on 16 March 2011. The record includes five tracks from Signs of Life, three tracks from Carnival of Rust, two tracks from Revolution Roulette, three tracks from Twilight Theater, and two original compositions.

Track listing

CD

DVD
 Late Goodbye
 Lift
 Carnival of Rust (original)
 Carnival of Rust (remastered)
 Locking up The Sun
 The Ultimate Fling
 Diamonds For Tears
 Dreaming Wide Awake
 War

Release history

Singles

Trivia
The physical release of the album has the option to come with a T-shirt, or a flag.

References

External links
 Official website of Poets of the Fall
 Official MySpace of Poets of the Fall
 Samples from the album

2011 compilation albums
Poets of the Fall albums